Kairos Na Pame Parakato is a Greek language album by Antonis Remos from 1998 which sold more than 100,000 copies and was certified double platinum."

Track listing
Let's go further—Pame parakato
It's a shame of you—Ndropi su
He—Aftos
You have the right—Ehis dikeoma
It's a pity—Krima
Come back again—Yirna xana
But you can't—Ma de mboris
Nights of loneliness—Nihtes monaxias
As long as you live—Oso zis
Where could have so much love gone—Pu na piye tosi agapi
So suddenly—Etsi xafnika
You're right—Ehis dikio
I was born an eagle—Ego yennithika aetos
With the door open—Me tin porta anihti

References

1998 albums
Antonis Remos albums